William Lockhart (1787 – 25 November 1856) was a British Conservative politician.

William Lockhart was born in 1787 the eldest son of Rev. Dr John Lockhart of the parish of Blackfriars Glasgow and his first wife Elizabeth Dinwoodie.

Lockhart was elected Conservative MP for Lanarkshire at the 1841 general election and held the seat until his death in 1856. It was recognized the although he was no great orator the ‘House of Commons did not possess a better man of business, nor one who studied more attentively the interests of his constituents'.

Alongside his role as MP, Lockhart was Dean of Faculties at Glasgow University from 1851 to 1853.

He was a Deputy-Lieutenant of Lanarkshire and Colonel Commandant of the Lanarkshire Yeomanry Cavalry.

Personal life 
He married on 16 April 1822 at Walcott Bath, Somerset, Mary Jane Palliser (1801–1881), the youngest daughter of Sir Hugh Palliser Bart (1768–1813) and his wife Mary (1758–1723). William and Mary divorced in the Scottish Courts in 1835. 

William Lockhart died on 25 November 1856 at Milton Lockhart of Febrile Disease while still a sitting MP. He was buried in Carluke churchyard on 2 December 1856. An inscription reads: 'Here buried William Lockhart MP for Lanarkshire 4th in descent from above Robert Lockhart of Birkhill and wife Jean Bruce of Clackmannan and eldest son of John Lockhart DD by Elizabeth Dunwiddie of Germiston unopposed he served his native country in Parliament from 1842 to his death, he was also a Deputy Lieutenant of the county and the Dean of Faculties of Glasgow university.'

Lockhart was the elder half-brother of writer and editor John Gibson Lockhart.

References

External links
 

Conservative Party (UK) MPs for English constituencies
UK MPs 1841–1847
UK MPs 1847–1852
UK MPs 1852–1857
1787 births
1856 deaths